Santiago Nejapilla is a town and municipality in Oaxaca in south-western Mexico.
It is part of the Teposcolula District in the center of the Mixteca Region

References

Municipalities of Oaxaca